Elsa Backus (born 19 December 1930) is a Finnish athlete. She competed in the women's javelin throw at the 1952 Summer Olympics. Torikka was married to American hammer thrower Bob Backus, whom she had met in Helsinki in 1956. She became a U.S. citizen in 1961.

References

External links
 

1930 births
Living people
People from Jaala
Finnish female javelin throwers
Olympic athletes of Finland
Athletes (track and field) at the 1952 Summer Olympics
American people of Finnish descent
Finnish expatriate sportspeople in the United States
Naturalized citizens of the United States
Sportspeople from Kymenlaakso